Anatoly Guseinovich Nagiyev (January 26, 1958 – October 28, 1981), known as The Mad One, was a Soviet serial killer, mass murderer and rapist who killed at least 6 women with severe cruelty between 1979 and 1980. He also raped at least 30 women over the same period of time and pursued famous Soviet singer Alla Pugacheva in attempt to kill her.

Early life 
Nagiyev was born on January 26, 1958, in Angarsk in a family from Dagestan, or according to other sources, they were Ingush or Kazakhs. Subsequently, the family with three children moved to the Kursk Oblast and settled in the city of Sudzha. Nagiyev actively engaged in sports, primarily athletic gymnastics, but was very aggressive since childhood. He had problems with girls, with some claiming they did not pay attention to him due to his small height of 1,57 meters. Between May and June 1975 he committed 3 rapes, and was sentenced to 6 years in prison, which he served in the Komi ASSR. In 1979, he was released on parole for his good behaviour.

Murders 
After his release he worked in the village of Chikshino in the Pechora region of the Komi ASSR. On January 30, 1979, in the city of Pechora, he raped and killed an accidental acquaintance named Olga Demyanenko in her apartment. On May 28, he raped and killed a train passenger named Daria Kravchenko, who was going to Pechora, taking advantage of the fact that the car was almost empty. The body was hidden in the luggage compartment under the seats. According to some accounts, the victim was killed because she resembled Alla Pugacheva.

Nagiyev soon returned to Kursk, where he got a job as a projectionist of a mobile cinema installation. The working conditions allowed him to spend a lot of time outside his permanent home.

On July 4, 1980, in a half-empty car on the train "Moscow-Kharkiv", he raped and killed 4 women - two conductors (Derevyanko and Zizyulina) and two passengers (Maria Lopatkina and Tatiana Kolesnikova). The victims' bodies were then thrown out of the window in the Oryol area between the stations "Stalnoi Kon" and "Stanovoi Kolodez".

In addition, from November 1979 to September 1980, he committed more than 30 rapes in various settlements of the USSR.

Arrest, trial and execution 
On the day of the last murders, Nagiyev, with traces of blood on his clothes and a knife in his hand, noticed the train electrician, but did not kill him. The detectives made a detailed list of the things that he had taken from his victims, and the jewelry's descriptions were sent to pawnshops and jewelry stores in several cities of the USSR. Nagiyev gave one such jewelry to an acquaintance, and when he came with a ring into a jewelry store in Kursk, he was identified. The acquaintance then told authorities who had given him the ring. The house of Nagiyev's mother was searched, during which his notebook with various addresses in various settlements of the USSR was found.

On September 12, 1980, Nagiyev was arrested in Dnipro. He was originally sent to a detention center in Oryol, but after a few months he tried to escape, tearing off his handcuffs and headbutting the guards, but was ultimately detained. Soon he was transferred to the Kursk SIZO for more intensive protection. After this, Nagiyev began to admit to his crimes, including those he was initially not aware of, for example, the two murders. It was also suggested that he committed more murders than he confessed to. In addition, while serving time, Nagiyev said that he wanted to kill Alla Pugacheva, and for this reason traveled several times to Moscow.

On July 2, 1981, Nagiyev was sentenced to death by the Kursk Regional Court, and was to be executed by firing squad.

In early August 1981, it was reported that Nagiyev had been transferred to the Novocherkassk prison so his death penalty could be carried out. On August 19, on his arrival in Novocherkassk, he managed to escape by slipping past a passing train. The then Minister of Interior Affairs, Nikolai Shchelokov, expected the killer to be captured in three weeks, but he was caught after two months. Nagiyev was hiding in one of the farms near Novocherkassk under the guise of being a gypsy, where he aroused suspicion by local residents, who alerted the police. On September 29, 1981, he was rearrested, which he actively resisted, suffering several bullet wounds as a result. The doctors were hardly able to heal his wounds, and on October 28, 1981, he was executed in the Novocherkassk prison.

In the media 

 In 2010, a documentary film titled "Wipe the Mad out!" was produced for the series "The investigation was conducted..", based on Nagiyev's story
 The documentary series "Legends of Soviet Detection" had an episode on him titled "The Pugacheva Hunter"
 Nagiyev was also mentioned in the documentary film "The Age Will Not See" (2010)

See also
 List of Russian serial killers

References

External links 
 Anatoly Nagiyev on the site "peoples.ru"
 Anatoly Nagiyev: The most mysterious serial killer of Soviet times

1958 births
1981 deaths
Executed mass murderers
Executed Soviet serial killers
Male serial killers
People executed for murder
People executed by the Soviet Union by firearm
Soviet mass murderers
Soviet rapists